The broadtail royal (Creon cleobis) is a butterfly in the monotypic genus Creon, in the family Lycaenidae. It is found in South Asia.

Subspecies
 Creon cleobis cleobis Godart, 1824 - South India, West Bengal, Assam - Thailand, Burma  and Bangladesh.
 Creon cleobis queda Corbet, 1938 - Peninsular Malaya
 Creon cleobis  igolotiana Murayama & Okamura, 1973 Corbet, 1938 - Philippines (Luzon)

Description

The wingspan of Creon is 27-38 millimeter.

Habit
Creon flies fast and has a liking for flowers. It can be found near forest streams areas, and comes to damp or wet patches.

References

Fauna of Pakistan
Iolaini
Monotypic butterfly genera
Taxa named by Lionel de Nicéville
Lycaenidae genera